Michael Donohue (born 12 November 1997) is an English professional footballer who plays for FC United of Manchester as a midfielder.

Early life
Donohue was born in Warrington.

Playing career
He began his career with Everton, moving on loan to Barrow in February 2016. He signed for Fleetwood Town in July 2017, making his senior debut for the club on 8 November 2017, in an EFL Trophy match against Carlisle United. He signed on loan for National League North side Tamworth on 16 March 2018, making his debut for the club the following day, as a 78th minute substitute for Darryl Knights in a 1–1 home draw with Harrogate Town.

In September 2018 he joined FC United of Manchester on a short-term loan, playing his first match for the club on 3 September against Bradford Park Avenue.

On 17 January 2019 he joined F.C. United on a permanent deal after being released by Fleetwood.

Career statistics

References

External links

1997 births
Living people
English footballers
Everton F.C. players
Barrow A.F.C. players
Fleetwood Town F.C. players
Tamworth F.C. players
Association football midfielders
F.C. United of Manchester players
Footballers from Warrington